Słowiki Nowe  or Nowe Słowiki is a village in the administrative district of Gmina Sieciechów, within Kozienice County, Masovian Voivodeship, in east-central Poland. The name means "New Słowiki" (it is close to the village of Stare Słowiki, which means "Old Słowiki"). The word słowiki in Polish means "nightingales".

The village has 255 inhabitants in 2006.

References

External links
 Official website of Gmina Sieciechów (in Polish)
 Public Information Bulletin for Gmina Sieciechów (in Polish)

Villages in Kozienice County